Guiseley is a town in metropolitan borough of the City of Leeds, West Yorkshire, England. Historically part of the West Riding of Yorkshire, it is situated south of Otley and Menston and is now a north-western suburb of Leeds.

It sits in the Guiseley and Rawdon ward of Leeds City Council and the Pudsey parliamentary constituency. At the 2001 census, Guiseley with Rawdon had a population of over 21,000, increasing to 22,347 at the 2011 Census.

The A65, which passes through the town, is the main shopping street. Guiseley railway station has regular train services into Leeds, Bradford and Ilkley stations on the Wharfedale Line.

Etymology
The name of Guiseley is first attested in an eleventh-century copy of a charter from around 972, as Gislicleh; it next appears in the Domesday Book of 1086 as Gisele and similar variants. The early spelling suggests that the first element of the name is an Old English personal name Gīslic. No such name is otherwise attested, but it is a plausible nickname form of names beginning in Gīsl-, such as Gīslbeorht. The second element comes from the Old English word lēah ('open land in woodland'). Thus the name seems once to have meant 'Gīslic's clearing'.

History

There have been Stone Age and Bronze Age finds in Guiseley and a Roman road, Road 72b, ran nearby on Guiseley Moor. A Saxon settlement existed around a spring which is now called Guiseley Wells and provided drinking water.

It was a largely farming community until the 18th century, when cottage-based woollen industry arose. In Victorian times it became industrialized, acquiring a railway connection in 1865 and a town hall (now Guiseley Theatre) in 1867.

Guiseley was an ancient parish in the West Riding of Yorkshire from the 12th century. The parish also included the townships of Carlton, Horsforth, Rawdon and Yeadon, all of which became separate civil parishes in 1866. In 1937 the civil parish of Guiseley was abolished and merged into the new Aireborough Urban District. In 1974 Aireborough was itself abolished and absorbed into the City of Leeds Metropolitan District in the new county of West Yorkshire.

St Oswald's Church

Guiseley's church, dedicated to St Oswald, was the centre of a large parish that included many surrounding villages. It was used by generations of the Longfellow family. Henry Wadsworth Longfellow's 5th great-grandfather left here for the New World in the 17th century. The rector of St Oswald's for several decades was Rev. Robert More (died in 1642), the father-in-law of the English explorer, Captain Christopher Levett. Patrick Brontë and Maria Branwell were married at St Oswald's and became the parents of six children, including Anne, Branwell, Charlotte and Emily Brontë.

Business

Crompton Parkinson was a major employer until its factory closed in 2004. The town was the home of Silver Cross, a pram manufacturer, whose factory was operational from 1936 to 2002.

The town is known for Harry Ramsden, whose fish and chip shop traded from a small shed next to the tram terminus at White Cross. In 1930 he opened "the world's biggest fish and chip shop". The original restaurant was closed in December 2011. The Wetherby Whaler group purchased the site and planned a £500,000 refurbishment to open during the summer of 2012. The new Wetherby Whaler restaurant opened on 22 May 2012.

Amenities
Guiseley has two retail parks: Guiseley Retail Park in the centre of town, and Westside Retail Park between Guiseley and Yeadon. The town has a Morrisons supermarket, charity shops and beauty stores on the High Street, as well as many pubs, bars, takeaways and restaurants located around the town and a leisure centre with a swimming pool and gym on The Green.

Many of the retail outlets in the town have been established on the converted sites of old factories or mills. Recently, an increasing number of stores of well known leading brands such as Argos, TK Maxx, Marks & Spencer (food), Asda Living, Currys, Costa Coffee, Next and Sports Direct have been opened in the area. McDonald's, KFC and Subway all have stores in the town.

Places of worship
In addition to St Oswald's there is also Guiseley Methodist Church and Guiseley Baptist Church which was built in 1883 on Oxford Road in the old town, and the Kingdom Hall of Jehovah's Witnesses on Otley Road.

Sports and recreation

Guiseley's professional football team, Guiseley A.F.C., play at Nethermoor Park. They played in the Conference North during the 2014–15 season,  gaining promotion to the Conference Premier through the playoffs. Guiseley Cricket Club shares the club house and plays in the Airedale-Wharfedale Senior Cricket League. Aireborough RUFC play at Nunroyd Park. Local philanthropist Jonathan Peate gave Nethermoor Park (Guiseley) and Nunroyd Park (between Yeadon and Guiseley) to local people in the early 20th century. Two other parks were regenerated in 2011/12,  Springfield Road and Parkinson's Park.  Parkinson's Park was given to Guiseley in the 1930s by Frank and Albert Parkinson. By 2002 it had become an wasteland with frequent occurrences of antisocial behaviour. It is now owned by Bellway Homes, and its rehabilitation is supported by the Friends of Parkinson's Park.

Guiseley is also home to England Athletics registered running club Airecentre Pacers.

Schools
Guiseley School on Fieldhead Road was built as a secondary modern in the 1960s and is sometimes known as Fieldhead School. Aireborough Grammar School opened in 1910 and closed in 1991.

Primary schools include Tranmere Park School and St. Oswald's C of E School.

Notable people
Harry Corbett, known for his children's television glove puppet character Sooty stage act, lived with his parents, who owned a fish and chip shop on Springfield Road.

Harry Corbett's son Matthew, who also went on to host The Sooty Show, was born here.

Tasmin Archer, whose co-written song "Sleeping Satellite" reached number one in the UK charts, and Maurice Lee of The Grumbleweeds lived in the town.

Geography
Guiseley is situated in a hanging valley between Airedale and Wharfedale. The A65 road passes through, there is a railway station and Leeds Bradford Airport is nearby.

See also
Listed buildings in Guiseley and Rawdon

References

External links

Guiseley On The Net
Guisely Baptist Church website
Guiseley School website

Further reading
Guiseley Conservation Area Appraisal and Management Plan

 
Places in Leeds
Towns in West Yorkshire
Former civil parishes in West Yorkshire